Roscoe Township is an inactive township in St. Clair County, in the U.S. state of Missouri.

Roscoe Township was erected in 1870, taking its name from the community of Roscoe, Missouri.

References

Townships in Missouri
Townships in St. Clair County, Missouri